Arnissa (before 1926: , Ostrovon;) is a town in the Pella regional unit of Macedonia, Greece. It is located near the Lake Vegoritida and Mount Kaimakchalan and is the seat of the Vegoritida Municipality. It has a population of 1,557 (as of 2011).

History
The settlemnt is first mentiond by Thucydides as one of the most ancent Macedonian cities, which is identified with the ancient ruins near the present-day village of the same name, specifically on the small peninsula of Lake Vegoritida, where various archaeological findings (architectural members and inscriptions) were found. The region came under the control of the Roman empire in the 1st centery BC. The Battle of Ostrovo was fought near the town in 1041. At the end of the 14th century, with the Ottoman conquest, Ostrovo became the seat of a mudirlik. In 1798 it came under the jurisdiction of Ali Pasha.

At the end of the 19th century, approximately 300 families lived in the settlement, of which 200 were Christian and the rest Muslim, while the population was Slavic-speaking. At the same time, tensions had begun between the patriarchal and exarchal Christians, with the latter occupying by force the two most important holy sites of the village.

During the Macedonian Struggle, many Ostrovites participated in the Greek guerrilla forces, with the main Macedonian fighters being the chieftain Christos Stogiannidis and the director of the National Center of Ostrov, Stavros Hatzicharisis. Other Macedonian fighters were Pantelis Theodorou, Photios Theodorou and Ioannis Koutsalis (Makris). Clashes took place in the area between the Greek and Turkish armies on 3 and 4 November 1912 during the Balkan Wars. During 1913, the Macedonian fighter Georgios Dikonymos-Makris served as the stationmaster of the settlement, who, in the same year, contributed to the extermination of the important comitatist Vasil Tsekalarov.

Several residents of Arnissa were killed during the war of 1940-1941 while serving in the Greek armed forces.

Sights
In 1953 , when the waters of the lake receded, the ruins of a prehistoric necropolis were revealed , which are also one of the attractions of the area. The holy churches of the Assumption (1860) and of the Holy Trinity (built in 1865) are also worth mentioning .

Geography 
Arnissa is located at an altitude of 560 meters, it is 20 km from Edessa and is located on the border with the prefecture of Florinis , while a short distance away, at an altitude of 1,150 meters, is the old settlement of Agios Athanasios , one of the most famous tourist places in the area.

Economy 
Arnissa is known for its apple crops, while there is also a women's cooperative that produces, using traditional means, pasta, spoon sweets, pickles, paprika and compotes.

Transport
The settlement is served by Regional and Proastiakos servics to Thessaloniki and Florina.

References

Populated places in Pella (regional unit)
Edessa, Greece